WKMZ-LP was a broadcast radio station licensed to Ruckersville, Virginia and serving Greene County, Virginia. WKMZ-LP was owned by Gateway Media, consisting of former Stu-Comm, Inc. board member Jon G. Hall, WNRN announcer John "Rusty" Cempre, and Robert M. Johnson. The station aired an oldies format, simulcasting the programming of WREN-LP 97.9 FM in Charlottesville. The station was taken silent on October 11, 2019, and its license was cancelled April 15, 2021, as the station had been off the air for more than one year.

References

2017 establishments in Virginia
Radio stations established in 2017
KMZ-LP
KMZ-LP
Radio stations disestablished in 2021
2021 disestablishments in Virginia
Defunct radio stations in the United States
KMZ-LP